The Armstrong Whitworth A.W.29 was a British bomber aircraft built by Armstrong Whitworth Aircraft.

Design and development
It was built to satisfy Air Ministry specification P. 27/32, which was for a single-engined long-range day bomber. The A.W.29 was a mid-wing cantilever monoplane. Its front fuselage was a welded tubular steel structure, and the rear fuselage a monocoque light alloy with an unbraced tailplane, fin and rudder. The conventional landing gear was hydraulically retractable by either an engine-driven or hand pump leaving the tyres partially exposed. The long-chord cowled, nose-mounted engine drove a three-bladed propeller.

The A.W.29 was a two-crew aircraft. The pilot was seated ahead of the wing leading edge and the gunner/observer in a distant cockpit aft of the spar enclosed in a hand-operated turret. The aft cockpit could be fitted with a second set of controls for flight training.

Not long after the A.W.29's first flight on 6 December 1936, it was damaged in a wheels up landing.  Since the Fairey Battle had been awarded the P27/32 contract, the A.W.29 was not repaired to fly again.

Specifications

References

1930s British bomber aircraft
A.W.29
Single-engined tractor aircraft
Mid-wing aircraft
Aircraft first flown in 1936